Lakha Road is a town in Naushahro Firoz District in Sindh province of Pakistan.

Naushahro Feroze District

The law and order situation if the city is very unsatisfactory. There is no education and health standards.